Dean R. Appling is an American biochemist and Associate Dean, Lester J. Reed Professor at University of Texas at Austin and a published author.
More information on Dean Appling's lab, focused on folic acid research and affectionately called the Folic Acid Research Team ("FART"), can be found at https://sites.cns.utexas.edu/applinglab/home.

References

Year of birth missing (living people)
Living people
University of Texas at Austin faculty
American biochemists